The Lanzhou−Xinjiang railway or Lanxin railway, is the longest railway in Northwestern China. It runs 1904 kilometres (1,183 miles) from Lanzhou, Gansu, through the Hexi Corridor, to Ürümqi, in Xinjiang. It was Xinjiang's only rail link with the rest of China until the opening of the Lanzhou–Xinjiang high-speed railway in December 2014. The railway follows the path of the ancient Silk Road.

History 
The Lanzhou–Xinjiang railway, often abbreviated as the Lanxin line, is the longest railway built by the People's Republic of China. It was built by the China Railway Engineering Corporation. Construction of the initial stage (to Ürümqi) started in 1952, completed in 1962 and opened in 1966. The extension to the Kazakhstan border was built in the late 1980s, linkup with the Kazakhstan Railroads achieved on September 12, 1990. After the completion of the 20 km Wushaoling Tunnel in 2006, the railway from Lanzhou to Ürümqi is all double-tracked.

Route 

The Lanxin railway's eastern terminus is Lanzhou railway station. Lanzhou is a railway junction city in eastern Gansu Province, where the Lanzhou–Qinghai, Baotou–Lanzhou and Longhai Railways converge. From Lanzhou, the line heads west, across the Yellow River, into the Hexi Corridor, where it passes through Gansu cities Wuwei, Jinchang, Zhangye, Jiuquan and Jiayuguan, en route to Xinjiang. Once in Xinjiang, the railway passes through Hami, Shanshan, Turpan and Dabancheng, before reaching Ürümqi in central Xinjiang.

The Lanxin railway is sometimes categorized to include the Northern Xinjiang railway, which continues west from Ürümqi to Alashankou, on the Kazakhstan border. The distance from Alashankou to Lanzhou is 2360 km. Beyond Alashankou, the railway links up with the Turkestan–Siberia railway of Central Asia and eventually reaches Rotterdam.

Station list

The northern branch 

The railway's northern branch extends 477 kilometres from Ürümqi to Alataw Pass (its westernmost point), where China's Alashankou railway station is connected to Kazakhstan's Dostyk station.

The southern branch 

The railway also has a southern branch, which splits off the main line near Turpan (east of Ürümqi), and runs west to Kashgar at the westernmost tip of the country. It was completed in 1999.

Cargo 
Xinjiang coal is one of the main types of freight shipped along the railway. In 2010, the railway is expected to ship 30 million tons of it, and by 2012, the amount is anticipated to rise to 50 million tons.

Parallel high-speed passenger rail line 

A new high-speed passenger rail line from Lanzhou to Xinjiang opened in December 2014. The line is mostly parallel to the existing Lanxin railway, with the exception of also serving Xining, Qinghai rather than staying entirely within Gansu province on the way to Xinjiang. The estimated cost was 143.5 billion yuan. Since the completion of this route, the older Lanxin railway is used mostly for freight.

There is also a planned railway connecting Golmud and Korla, to be an alternative railway corridor to Xinjiang.

Gallery

References 

 
 
 

Railway lines in China
Rail transport in Gansu
Rail transport in Xinjiang
Railway lines opened in 1962